Quranism, Qur'anism, or a Quran-centric approach is a movement within Islam. It holds the belief that traditional religious clergy has corrupted religion, and divine law should be derived solely from the Quran. Quran centric Muslims advise that hadith literature (which are the oral traditions that were preserved describing the seerah of the Messenger of Allah) can be used to give context to the Quran. This is a concept known as sabab e nuzool - which is the circumstances surrounding the revelation and that hadith should not be used a divine source of law itself. In the Muslim world, Quranists have faced opposition and have been labeled as "animals" and "apostates" in fatwas issued against them. In several countries, being a Quranist is punishable by death and/or torture. Quranist authors who fear for their lives write anonymously or under a pseudonym.

Each hadith-espousing sect of Islam has its own distinct collection of hadith upon which its followers rely, the differences in which are rejected by other sects despite these collections overlapping for the most part, while the Quranists reject all of the differing collections of hadith and have none of their own. This methodological difference has led to considerable divergence between Quranists, and both Sunnis and Shia (the two largest sects in Islam) in matters of theology and law as well as the understanding of the Quran.

Quranism is similar to movements in other Abrahamic religions such as the Karaite in Judaism and the  view of some Protestant Christians.

Terminology
Most Quranists define themselves simply as "Muslims", while other names used include "Quranic Muslims", "Submitters [to God]". Other sects refer to them as "Quranists", and also sometimes as "reformists" or "progressive Muslims", although Quranists themselves mostly deny these names.

Doctrine
Quranists believe that the Quran is clear, complete, and that it can be fully understood without recourse to the hadith and sunnah. Therefore, they use the Quran itself to interpret the Quran:

In the centuries following Muhammad's death, Quranists did not believe in Naskh. The Kufan scholar Dirar ibn Amr's Quranist belief led him to deny in Al-Masih ad-Dajjal, Punishment of the Grave, and Shafa'ah in the 8th century. The Egyptian scholar Muhammad Abu Zayd's Quranist commentaries led him to reject the belief in the Isra and Mi'raj in the early 20th century. In his rationalist Quran commentary published in 1930, which uses the Quran itself to interpret the Quran, he claimed that verse 17:1 was an allusion to the Hijrah and not Isra and Mi'raj.

Syed Ahmad Khan argued that, while the Quran remained socially relevant, reliance on hadith limits the vast potential of the Quran to a particular cultural and historical situation.

The extent to which Quranists reject the authority of the Hadith and Sunnah varies, but the more established groups have thoroughly criticised the authority of the Hadith and reject it for many reasons. The most common view being the Quranists who say that Hadith is not mentioned in the Quran as a source of Islamic theology and practice, was not recorded in written form until a century after the death of Muhammad, and contain internal errors and contradictions as well as contradictions with the Quran. For Sunni Muslims, "the sunnah", i.e the sunnah (the way) of the prophet, is one of the two primary sources of Islamic law, and while the Quran has verses enjoining Muslims to obey the Prophet, the Quran never talks about "sunnah" in connection with Muhammad or other prophets. The term sunnah appears several times, including in the phrase "sunnat Allah" (way of God), but not "sunnat al-nabi" (way of the prophet) – the phrase customarily used by proponents of hadith.

Differences with traditional Islam 
Quranists believe that the Quran is the sole source of religious law and guidance in Islam and reject the authority of sources outside of the Quran like Hadith and Sunnah. Quranists suggest that vast majority of hadith literature are forged and that the Quran criticizes the hadith both in technical sense and general sense. Quranists claim that the Sunni and Shias have distorted the meaning of the verses to support their agenda, especially in verses about women and war. Due to these differences in theology, there are differences between traditional Islamic and Quranist practices.

Shahada (creed) 

Salah (prayer) 
Among Quranists, different views can be found in ritual prayer (salah). The vast majority of Quranist movements, like in traditional Islam, pray five times a day, but there are also those who perform three or two daily prayers. A minority of Quranists see the Arabic word  as a spiritual contact or a spiritual devotion to God through the observance of the Quran and worship to God, and therefore not as a standard ritual to be performed.

The blessings for Muhammad and Abraham, which are part of the traditional ritual, are not practiced by most Quranists in the call to prayer and in the prayer itself, arguing that the Quran mentions prayers are only for God, and the Quran tells believers to make no distinction between any messenger.

There are other minor differences: for Quranists, menstruation does not constitute an obstacle to prayer, men and women are allowed to pray together in a mosque and that there is no catching up later once a prayer is missed.

Wudu (ablution) 
The ablution in prayer (Wudu) only includes washing the face, hands up to the elbows and stroking the head and feet, since only these steps are mentioned in the Quran.

Zakat (alms tax) 
In traditional Islam, giving Zakat is a religious duty and amounts to 2.5 percent of the annual income. The Quranists give Zakat based on the Quranic verses. In the opinion of many Quranists, Zakat must be paid, but the Quran does not specify a percentage because it does not appear explicitly in the Quran. Other Quranists are in agreement with the 2.5 percent, but do not give the Zakat annually, but from every money they earn.

Sawm (fasting) 
The majority of Quranists fast for all of Ramadan, but do not see the last day of Ramadan as a holy day.

Hajj (pilgrimage) 
Extra-Quranic traditions in the Hajj, such as kissing or hugging the black stone and the symbolic stoning of the devil by throwing stones are rejected and seen as possible shirk by Quranists.

Ridda (apostasy) 
According to Sunni hadith, a Muslim who leaves his religion should be killed. However, since Quranists do not accept hadith and no command to kill apostates can be found in the Quran, they reject this procedure. In addition, 2:256, which states that "there shall be no compulsion/pressure in religion", is taken into account and everyone is allowed to freely decide on their religion.

Polygamy 
Quranists, unlike Sunnis and Shias, have very strict rules with regard to polygamy (having multiple wives). Some Quranist movements allow polygamy only on the condition of the adoption of orphans who have mothers and do not want to lose them, but other Quranist movements argue that although it is not explicitly banned, polygamy is a thing of the past because the regulations which are contained in the Quran are very strict and they have been fulfilled by almost nobody on Earth, therefore polygamy cannot be practiced anymore. In the extremely rare case in which it may be practiced, there is a strict limit on the number of wives, which is four.

Military Jihad 
Most Quranist movements interpret the "holy war" as a solely defensive war, because according to them that is the only type of war allowed in the Quran. A war is only "holy" when Muslims are threatened on their own lands. Therefore, unlike the Sunnis and Salafi-Jihadis, for the Quranists "holy war" does not refer to an offensive war against non-Muslim countries or communities in any circumstances.

Food 
Quranists can eat food which is prepared by Christians and Jews as stated in the Quran, but some Quranists believe that animals which are raised by Christians and Jews should still be blessed before they are eaten. According to Quranists, the Quran forbids the inflicting of pain on the animal during its slaughter, thus for them, the techniques of slaughtering animals in the Western world are illegitimate. Unlike Sunnis, Quranists can eat food with both of their hands, even with their left hands because the Quran does not forbid it.

Dress code 
Clothing does not play a key role in Quranism. All Quranist movements agree that Islam has no sets of traditional clothings, except the rules described in the Quran. Therefore, traditional Islamic-style beards are not necessary. However, men and women are still expected to lower their gaze to avoid looking at other people’s intimate parts as well as hide their own.

Hadith 
Quranists believe that hadith, while not being reliable sources of religion, can be used as a reference to get an idea on historical events. They argue that there is no harm in using hadith to get a common idea on the history, while not taking them as certain historical facts. According to them, a hadith narration about history can be true or can be false, but a hadith narration adding rulings to religion is always completely false. They believe that the trustworthiness of the narrator is not enough to give credibility to the hadith as it is stated in the Quran that Muhammad himself could not recognize who was a genuine believer and who was a hypocrite. Moreover, Quranists quote Sahih Muslim 42:7147 to argue Muhammad forbid any hadith beside the Quran.

Tafsir 
Although there are Quranist tafsir works, for the most part Quranists do not have tafsir and do not think that it is needed. They believe the Quran does not give anyone the authority to interpret because, as stated in Quran, Allah sends guidance individually.

Other 
The following aspects can be cited as further examples which, compared to traditional Islam, are rejected by Quranists or regarded as irrelevant:

 Quranists see circumcision as irrelevant.
 Quranists see Eid al-Fitr (festival of breaking the fast) and Eid ul-Adha (Islamic festival of sacrifice) as merely cultural holidays, not holy.
 Quranists sometimes do not consider the headscarf (hijab) for women to be obligatory.
 Quranists are strictly against the torture and stoning to death of adulterers or homosexuals.
 Quranists are against the prohibition of music, singing, drawing. This includes drawings of prophets, a practice Quranists do not forbid as long as the images are not idolised.
 Quranists are against the prohibition for a man to wear gold or silk, to shave his beard, etc.
 Quranists do not consider dogs unclean or to be avoided.
 Quranists do not necessarily believe in Imam Mahdi or the Dajjal, as they are not mentioned in the Quran.

History

Early Islam

Quranists date their beliefs back to the time of Muhammad, who they claim prohibited the writing of hadiths. As they believe that hadith, while not being reliable sources of religion, can be used as a reference to get an idea on historical events, they point out several narrations about early Islam to support their beliefs. According to one of these narrations, one of Muhammad's companions and successor Umar, also prohibited the writing of hadith and destroyed existing collections during his rule as Caliph. Similar reports claim when Umar appointed a governor to Kufa, he told him: "You will be coming to the people of a town for whom the buzzing of the Qur'an is as the buzzing of bees. Therefore, do not distract them with the Hadiths, and thus engage them. Bare the Qur'an and spare the Hadith from God's messenger!".

The centrality of the Quran in the religious life of the Kufans that Umar described was quickly changing, however. A few decades later, a letter was sent to the Ummayad caliph Abd al-Malik ibn Marwan regarding the Kufans: "They abandoned the judgement of their Lord and took hadiths for their religion; and they claim that they have obtained knowledge other than from the Koran . . . They believed in a book which was not from God, written by the hands of men; they then attributed it to the Messenger of God."

In the following years, the taboo against the writing and following of hadiths had receded to such an extent that the Ummayad leader Umar II ordered the first official collection of Hadith. Abu Bakr ibn Muhammad ibn Hazm and Ibn Shihab al-Zuhri, were among those who wrote Hadiths at Umar II's behest.

Despite the trend towards hadiths, the questioning of their authority continued during the Abbasid dynasty and existed during the time of Al-Shafi'i, when a group known as "Ahl al-Kalam" argued that the prophetic example of Muhammad "is found in following the Quran alone", rather than Hadith. The majority of Hadith, according to them, was mere guesswork, conjecture, and bidah, while the book of God was complete and perfect, and did not require the Hadith to supplement or complement it.

There were prominent scholars who rejected traditional ahadith like Dirar ibn Amr. He wrote a book titled The Contradiction Within Hadith. However, the tide had changed from the earlier centuries to such an extent that Dirar was beaten up and had to remain in hiding until his death. Like Dirar ibn Amr, the scholar Abu Bakr al-Asamm also had little use for hadiths.

19th century
In South Asia during the 19th century, the Ahle Quran movement formed partially in reaction to the Ahle Hadith whom they considered to be placing too much emphasis on Hadith. Many Ahle Quran adherents from South Asia were formerly adherents of Ahle Hadith but found themselves incapable of accepting certain hadiths. Abdullah Chakralawi, Khwaja Ahmad Din Amritsari, Chiragh Ali, and Aslam Jairajpuri were among the people who promulgated Quranist beliefs in India at the time.

20th century
In Egypt during the early 20th century, the ideas of Quranists like Muhammad Tawfiq Sidqi grew out of the reformist ideas of Muhammad Abduh, specifically a rejection of taqlid and an emphasis on the Quran. Muhammad Tawfiq Sidqi of Egypt "held that nothing of the Hadith was recorded until after enough time had elapsed to allow the infiltration of numerous absurd or corrupt traditions." Muhammad Tawfiq Sidqi wrote an article titled Al-Islam Huwa ul-Qur'an Wahdahu ('Islam is the Qur'an Alone) that appeared in the Egyptian journal Al-Manar, which argues that the Quran is sufficient as guidance:

Like some of their counterparts in Egypt such as Muhammad Abu Zayd and Ahmed Subhy Mansour, some reformist scholars in Iran who adopted Quranist beliefs came from traditional institutions of higher learning. Shaykh Hadi Najmabadi, Mirza Rida Quli Shari'at-Sanglaji, Mohammad Sadeqi Tehrani, and Ayatollah Borqei were educated in traditional Shia universities in Najaf and Qom. However, they believed that some beliefs and practices that were taught in these universities, such as the veneration of Imamzadeh and a belief in Raj'a, were irrational and superstitious and had no basis in the Quran. And rather than interpreting the Quran through the lens of hadith, they interpreted the Quran with the Quran (tafsir al-qur'an bi al-qur'an). These reformist beliefs provoked criticism from traditional Shia scholars like Ayatollah Khomeini, who attempted to refute the criticisms made by Sanglaji and other reformists in his book Kashf al-Asrar. Quran-centered beliefs have also spread among lay Muslims like Iranian American, Ali Behzadnia, who became Deputy Minister of Health and Welfare and acting Minister of Education shortly after the Iranian Revolution. He has criticized the government in Iran for being undemocratic and totally alien to the "Islam of the Quran".

Quranism also took on a political dimension in the 20th century when Muammar al-Gaddafi declared the Quran to be the constitution of Libya. Gaddafi asserted the transcendence of the Quran as the sole guide to Islamic governance and the unimpeded ability of every Muslim to read and interpret it. He had begun to attack the religious establishment and several fundamental aspects of Sunni Islam. He denigrated the roles of the ulama, imams, and Islamic jurists and questioned the authenticity of the hadith, and thereby the sunna, as a basis for Islamic law.

Criticism and persecution 

Quranism has been criticised by Sunnis and Shias. The Sunni belief is that "the Quran needs the Sunnah more than the Sunnah needs the Quran". The Sunni and Shia establishment argues that Islam can not be practised without hadith.

Quranist doctrines have grown throughout the world in the twenty-first century, and supporters have faced opposition. Quranists were labeled as "disbelievers," "animals," "apostates," and "hypocrites" in fatwas issued against them. In several countries, being a Quranist is punishable by death. Followers of the Quran-only approach are persecuted and expect sanctions. For this reason, many Quranist authors who fear for their lives write anonymously or under a pseudonym.

Egypt 
In Egypt, Quranists face persecution, imprisonment, torture and exile.

Sudan 
In Sudan, Quranist men were imprisoned and sentenced to death for only recognizing the Quran and rejecting the Sunnah.

Turkey 
In Turkey, Quranist ideas became particularly noticeable, with portions of the youth either leaving Islam or converting to Quranism. There has been significant Quranist scholarship in Turkey, with there being even Quranist theology professors in significant universities, including scholars like Yaşar Nuri Öztürk and Caner Taslaman. Some believe that there are secret Quranists even in the Diyanet itself.

The Turkish Directorate of Religious Affairs (Diyanet) regularly criticizes and insults Quranists, gives them no recognition and calls them kafirs (disbelievers). Quranists responded with arguments and challenged them to a debate.

Saudi Arabia 
In Saudi Arabia, Quranism is described as apostasy, therefore punishable by death. Saudi Quranist scholar, Hassan Farhan al-Maliki, was arrested and charged with death penalty for promoting ideas that have been described as "Quranist", "moderate", "tolerant", and one of opposition to the more strict Saudi wahhabi ideology. Other Saudi intellectuals, like Abdul Rahman al-Ahdal, continue to advocate for the abandonment of hadith and a return to the Quran.

Russia 
The spread of Quranist beliefs in Russia has provoked the anger of the Sunni establishment. The Russian Council of Muftis issued a fatwa against Quranism and threatened the Quranists.

South Africa 
In South Africa, an Oxford educated history scholar, Taj Hargey, established the Open Mosque. Hargey intended the mosque to be more open to demographics traditionally shunned by Sunni and Shia mosques, like women. Hargey describes the principles of the mosque as, "Quran-centric, gender equality, non-sectarian, inter-cultural and independent". He was criticized.

Kazakhstan 
The Quranists have repeatedly become a target for criticism from the Supreme Clergy of Kazakhstan.

Notable organizations

Ahle Quran

Ahle Quran is an organisation formed by Abdullah Chakralawi, who described the Quran as "ahsan Hadith", meaning most perfect hadith and consequently claimed it does not need any addition. His movement relies entirely on the chapters and verses of the Quran. Chakralawi's position was that the Quran itself was the most perfect source of tradition and could be exclusively followed. According to Chakralawi, Muhammad could receive only one form of revelation (wahy), and that was the Quran. He argues that the Quran was the only record of divine wisdom, the only source of Muhammad's teachings, and that it superseded the entire corpus of hadith, which came later.

Izgi Amal

This is a Quranist organization in Kazakhstan whose Cyrillic name, "Ізгі амал", may be transliterated into the Latin script as İzgi amal. It has an estimated 70 to 80 thousand members. Its leader, Aslbek Musin, is the son of the former Speaker of the Majlis, Aslan Musin.

Kala Kato

Kala Kato is a Quranist movement whose adherents reside mostly northern Nigeria, with some adherents residing in Niger. Kala Kato means a "man says" in the Hausa language, in reference to the sayings, or hadiths, posthumously attributed to Muhammad. Kala Kato accept only the Quran as authoritative and believe that anything that is not Kala Allah, which means what "God says" in the Hausa language, is Kala Kato.

Malaysian Quranic Society
The Malaysian Quranic Society was founded by Kassim Ahmad. The movement holds several positions distinguishing it from Sunnis and Shias such as a rejection of the status of hair as being part of the awrah; therefore exhibiting a relaxation on the observance of the hijab, which according to Quranists is not in the Quran.

Quran Sunnat Society
The Quran Sunnat Society is a Quranist movement in India. The movement was behind the first ever woman to lead mixed-gender congregational prayers in India. It maintains an office and headquarters within Kerala. There is a large community of Quranists in Kerala. One of its leaders, Jamida Beevi, has also spoken out against India's triple talaq law which is mostly based on the Sunni inspired Muslim Personal Law (Shariat) Application Act, 1937. The most prominent predecessor to the Quran Sunnat Society in India was from the views put forth by Ahmed Khan in the 19th century.

Tolu-e-Islam

The movement was initiated by Ghulam Ahmed Pervez. Ghulam Ahmed Pervez did not reject all hadiths; however, he accepted only hadiths that "are in accordance with the Quran or do not stain the character of the Prophet or his companions". The organization publishes and distributes books, pamphlets, and recordings of Pervez's teachings. Tolu-e-Islam does not belong to any political party, nor does it belong to any religious group or sect.

United Submitters International
In the United States, at the end of the 20th century, the Egyptian Quranist biochemist Rashad Khalifa, who is known as the discoverer of the Quran code (Code 19), which is a hypothetical mathematical code in the Quran, developed a theological doctrine that influenced Quranists in many other countries. With the help of computers, he carried out a numerical analysis of the Quran, which according to him clearly proved that it is of divine origin. The number 19, which is mentioned in chapter 74 of the Quran as being "one of the greatest miracles" played the fundamental role, which according to Khalifa can be found everywhere in the structure of the Quran, and the fact that a Quranist discovered such a big miracle proved the Quranist approach. Some objected to these beliefs and, in 1990, Khalifa was assassinated by someone associated with the Sunni group Jamaat ul-Fuqra.

The organization "United Submitters International" (USI) founded by Khalifa has its center in Tucson and has published a monthly newsletter with the title "Submitter's Perspective" since 1985. The movement popularized the phrase: "The Quran, the whole Quran, and nothing but the Quran."

A Turkish (of Kurdish descent) activist, Edip Yüksel, initially campaigned for a Quranist-Islamic revolution in Turkey, which is why he was imprisoned. Later he met Khalifa and joined the organisation after witnessing the "19 miracle". In 1989 he had to leave the country because of this and joined the headquarters in Tucson. Yüksel and two other authors created their own translation of the Quran. In some points, however, his views differ from those of Khalifa.

In Malaysia, a Submitter Kassim Ahmad wrote a book in which he called for a scientific evaluation of the Hadith and the entire Islamic tradition, as these are responsible for the backwardness of Muslims. He saw the Quran as the only sunnah of the Prophet Muhammad and criticized the classic Sunni view of the sunnah. His book was banned in Malaysia and Ahmad was declared a heretic.

Among those influenced by Khalifa's ideas include Edip Yüksel, Ahmad Rashad, and Nigerian High Court Judge, Isa Othman.

Notable individuals

Individuals with full or partial Quranistic ideas include:
Kassim Ahmad (1933–2017), Malaysian intellectual, writer, poet and an educator known for his rejection of the authority of hadiths. He was the founder of the Quranic Society of Malaysia. He was arrested in 1976 and released in 1981. At the time of his death, he was working on a Malay translation of the Quran.
Muammar Gaddafi ( 1942 – 20 October 2011), Libyan revolutionary, politician and political theorist. He governed Libya as the "Brotherly Leader" of the Great Socialist People's Libyan Arab Jamahiriya until 2011. He ruled according to his own Third International Theory.
Gamal al-Banna (1920–2013), Egyptian author and trade unionist.
Mustafa İslamoğlu (born 1960), Turkish theologian, poet and writer. He was criticised in Turkey and received threats for his ideas that promoted logic above tradition and denying the authority of hadith, who he saw to be fabricated.
Rashad Khalifa (1935–1990), Egyptian-American biochemist, professor doctor, theologian, computer expert and Islamic reformer. In his book Quran, Hadith and Islam and his English translation of the Quran, Khalifa argued that the Quran alone is the sole source of Islamic belief and practice. He claimed that the Quran had a code-system based on the number 19 which proved it's divinity. He was assassinated by Sunni traditionalists on January 31, 1990.
Samina Ali (born at an unknown date in the late 20th century), Indian-American author and activist. She is the co-founder of American Muslim feminist organization Daughters of Hajar. She serves as the curator of Muslima: Muslim Women’s Art and Voices, a global, virtual exhibition for the International Museum of Women (IMOW), now part of Global Fund for Women.
Sam Khalifa (born 1963), American former professional baseball player.
Hassan al-Maliki (born 1970), a Saudi Arabian writer, Islamic historian and Islamic scholar who has been put on trial by the Saudi establishment for his views. Al-Maliki's views have been described as "Quranist", "moderate", "tolerant", and one of opposition to the more violent and strict wahhabi ideology.
Irshad Manji (born 1968), Ugandan-Canadian educator and author.
Ahmed Subhy Mansour (born 1949), Egyptian-American Islamic scholar. He was exiled from Egypt for his views and is now living in the United States as a political refugee.
Chekannur Maulavi (born 1936; disappeared 29 July 1993), Islamic cleric who lived in Edappal in Malappuram district of Kerala, India. He was noted for his controversial and unconventional interpretation of Islam based on the Quran alone. He disappeared on 29 July 1993 under mysterious circumstances and is now widely believed to be dead.
Yaşar Nuri Öztürk (1951-2016), Turkish university professor of Islamic theology, lawyer, columnist and a former member of Turkish parliament. He has given many conferences on Islamic thought, humanity and human rights in Turkey, the USA, Europe, the Middle East and the Balkans. In 1999 members of a violent Sunni extremist group called Great Eastern Islamic Raiders' Front (İBDA-C) confessed that they had planned an assassination attempt that never took place. Öztürk died in 2016, due to stomach cancer.
Ahmad Rashad (born 1949), American sportscaster (mostly with NBC Sports) and former professional football player. Ahmad Rashad studied the Arabic language and the Quran with his mentor, the late Rashad Khalifa.
Muhammad Tawfiq Sidqi (1881–1920), Egyptian scholar and physician who focused on criticising hadith as a whole religiously from the Quran as well as based on hadithic pseudo-scientific claims on medicine.
Mohamed Talbi (1921–2017), Tunisian historian and professor. He was the founder of the Association Internationale des Musulmans Coraniques (AIMC), or International Association of Quranic Muslims.
Caner Taslaman (born 1968), Turkish academician, Quran expert and writer known for his works on The Big Bang theory and the scientific structure of the Quran.
Edip Yüksel (born 1957), Turkish-Kurdish-American philosopher, lawyer, Quranist advocate, author of Nineteen: God's Signature in Nature and Scripture, Manifesto for Islamic Reform and a co-author of Quran: A Reformist Translation. He taught philosophy and logic at Pima Community College and medical ethics and criminal law courses at Brown Mackie College.
In addition to these names, Quranists claim Muhammad was also a Quranist.

See also 
 Liberalism and progressivism within Islam
 Non-denominational Muslim
 Karaite Judaism, an analogous movement within Judaism

Notes

References

Further reading
 Aisha Y. Musa, Hadith as Scripture: Discussions on the Authority of Prophetic Traditions in Islam, New York: Palgrave, 2008. .
 Ali Usman Qasmi, Questioning the Authority of the Past: The Ahl al-Qur'an Movements in the Punjab, Oxford University Press, 2012. .
 Daniel Brown, Rethinking Tradition in Modern Islamic Thought, Cambridge University Press, 1996. .

 
Quranist Muslims
Islamic terminology
Islamic branches
Islam in Turkey